Leopoldau is an end station of the  of the Vienna U-Bahn. It is located in the Floridsdorf District, underneath the Wien Leopoldau railway station, which is served by both regional and S-Bahn trains. The station opened in 2006.

References

Buildings and structures in Floridsdorf
Railway stations opened in 2006
2006 establishments in Austria
Vienna U-Bahn stations
Railway stations in Austria opened in the 21st century

de:U-Bahn-Station Leopoldau